Sumeet Patel (born 9 October 1960) is an Indian sailor. He competed in the 49er event at the 2004 Summer Olympics.

References

External links
 

1960 births
Living people
Indian male sailors (sport)
Olympic sailors of India
Sailors at the 2004 Summer Olympics – 49er
Place of birth missing (living people)